Mont Sainte-Cécile, also referred to as Petit-Mégantic is a mountain that rises to  located in Sainte-Cécile-de-Whitton, Quebec, Canada.

Etymology
Mont Sainte-Cécile and the eponymous village at its foot were named after Saint Cecilia.

Geography
The mountain is located in the municipality of Sainte-Cécile-de-Whitton, Quebec in the regional county municipality of Le Granit. It lies in the boundary ranges of the Longfellow Mountains in the Appalachians and on the edge of the Chaudière River valley.

Geology
Mont Sainte-Cécile is made of granodiorite that dates from the upper Devonian period ( million years ago). To its southeast, where it collects water and drains into the Chaudière River, is the Drolet lens, a clayey till that was settled in the valley during the massive drainage of Glacial Lake Gayhurst when it filled an overdeepening with remnants of glacial lacustrine deposits.

Granit is currently being extracted from the eastern flank of the mountain.

Wildlife

Recreation
The mountain does not currently have any recreo-touristic layout. A hiking trail stretching from its base to the summit had been planned, but the promoters of the trail did not succeed in getting permission from the landowners to construct a crucial part of the trail, so the project has been put aside.

References

Mountains of Quebec under 1000 metres
Appalachian Mountains